Evolutionary Biology is a college-level evolutionary biology textbook written by Eli C. Minkoff that is 627 pages long. It was published in 1983 by Addison-Wesley. This is Minkoff's first foray into the world of college-level textbook authorship. The book contains an index and various biographical references.

About the book

The textbook Evolutionary Biology was written and published in 1983 during which Minkoff was the head of the Biology department at Bates College. The book is written in a format to which it could be used in an evolutionary biology 101 course. The book contains over 25 chapters, for example, "The Origin and Early Evolution of Life".

Bibliography
 Eli C. Minkoff, 1983 Evolutionary Biology , 1st Edition, Addison-Wesley, 

1983 in biology
1983 non-fiction books
Biology books